Hacılar is a town and district of Kayseri Province in the Central Anatolia region of Turkey. The mayor is Bilal Özdoğan (AKP).

References 

Populated places in Kayseri Province
Districts of Kayseri Province
Towns in Turkey